The Kharasrota is a river that flows in Odisha state of India. It is a tributary of the Brahmani River.

See also 
 Brahmani River

References 

Rivers of Odisha